The Black River is a  waterway that flows into the Okefenokee Swamp in the U.S. state of Georgia.

See also
List of rivers of Georgia

References 

USGS Hydrologic Unit Map - State of Georgia (1974)

Rivers of Georgia (U.S. state)